is an anime director born in Hokkaidō, Japan. In 1982, Moriwaki founded  (now known as ) with Yoshinobu Sanada, Toshiyuki Honda, and Hiroshi Fukutomi). From the first Doraemon movie produced by Shin'ei Dōga until 1989, she was in charge of production for the movies. She then acted as assistant director for Nobita's Monstrous Underwater Castle and the Kaibutsu-kun movie Demon Sword.

Projects

As director

B-PROJECT～Zecchō＊Emotion～
Hime Chen! Otogi Chikku Idol Lilpri 
Highschool! Kimen-gumi Movie
Hyper Doll
Jewelpet Kira☆Deco! 
Dorami-chan: Mini-Dora SOS 
Onegai My Melody (and storyboards)
Onegai! Samia Don 
Oruchuban Ebichu 
PriPara, (and storyboards)
PriPara Mi~nna no Akogare Let's Go PriPari 
Tantei Opera Milky Holmes
Welcome to Demon School! Iruma-kun

Other
Ashita Tenki ni Nare! (storyboards)
Chu-Bra!! (storyboards)
Doraemon: Nobita's Monstrous Underwater Castle (assistant director)
Doraemon: Nobita's Pirate Hiking (storyboards, episode director)
Doraemon: Sasuga no Sarutobi (chief in charge of character production)
Dragon Quest (ep.11 storyboards)
Kaibutsu-kun: Demon Sword (assistant director)
Sonic X (storyboards, episode director)
YAWARA! a fashionable judo girl! (production director)

References

External links
 

Anime directors
Living people
People from Hokkaido
Japanese women film directors
Year of birth missing (living people)